The Cabinet of Hugues-Bernard Maret was announced on 10 November 1834 by King Louis Philippe I.
It replaced the Cabinet of Étienne Maurice, comte Gérard.

The cabinet became known as the three-day ministry since the President of the council, Hugues-Bernard Maret, duc de Bassano resigned on 14 November 1834 following an outburst of ridicule in the press, led by the Moniteur.
The cabinet was replaced on 18 November 1834 by the Cabinet of Édouard Adolphe Mortier.

Ministers
The cabinet was created by ordinance of 10 November 1834. The ministers were:

References

Sources

French governments
1834 establishments in France
1834 disestablishments in France
Cabinets established in 1834
Cabinets disestablished in 1834